Anton Maikkula (born 3 February 1997) is a Swedish footballer who plays for IFK Berga.

References

External links

Swedish footballers
1997 births
Living people
Allsvenskan players
Superettan players
Ettan Fotboll players
Kalmar FF players
IFK Värnamo players
Norrby IF players
Utsiktens BK players
Association football defenders